Paasonen is a Finnish surname. Notable people with the surname include:

 Aladár Paasonen (1898–1974), Finnish military officer
 Sakari Paasonen (born 1935), Finnish sport shooter
 Jani Paasonen (born 1975), Finnish rally driver
 Susanna Paasonen (born 1975), Finnish feminist scholar
 Heikki Paasonen (linguist) (1865–1919), Finnish linguist and ethnographer
 Heikki Paasonen (born 1983), Finnish television presenter

Finnish-language surnames